DelNS1-2019-nCoV-RBD-OPT is a COVID-19 vaccine candidate developed by Beijing Wantai Biological, Xiamen University and the University of Hong Kong.

On 14 December 2022, the vaccine was listed by the National Health Commission of China as a secondary booster dose option for people who have completed their third doses of inactivated COVID-19 vaccines for 6 months or longer.

References 

Clinical trials
Chinese COVID-19 vaccines
Science and technology in China
Viral vector vaccines
Nasal sprays